Oberea balineae is a species of flat-faced longhorn beetle in the tribe Saperdini. It was described by Karl Heller in 1915 based on specimens from Los Baños, the Philippines.

References

B
Beetles of Asia
Insects of the Philippines
Beetles described in 1915
Taxa named by Karl Borromaeus Maria Josef Heller